Pathan Colony  or Pathan Challi  is a neighborhood in the Karachi West district of Karachi, Pakistan. It was previously administered as part of the SITE Town borough, which was disbanded in 2011.

There are several ethnic groups in Pathan Colony including Punjabis, Sindhis,, Seraikis, Ismailis, etc., but the main population of Pathan Colony consist on Pakhtun, which is 90% in the area

Main areas 
 Pathan Colony
 Hyder Chali

References

External links 
 Karachi Website.
 Local Government Sindh.

Neighbourhoods of Karachi
SITE Town